Vasyl Petrovych Tsushko (born February 1, 1963, in Nadrichne, Tarutinsky Raion, Odesa Oblast) is a Ukrainian politician former Minister of Internal Affairs of Ukraine, former Minister of Internal Affairs of Ukraine and former Head of the Antimonopoly Committee of Ukraine 2010-2014.

From July 2010 to August 2011 he was the party-leader of the Socialist Party of Ukraine.

Biography
Vasyl Tsushko was born in the Nadrichne village, Odesa Oblast in the Ukrainian SSR (now Ukraine); he is of mixed Ukrainian-Moldovan ancestry and is fluent in Romanian language. In 1982, Tsushko finished the Izmail Vocational school of Mechanics and Electronics of Agriculture. From 1983–1985, Tsushko served in the Soviet Army. After completing the 2 years army course, he went to study at the economic faculty at the Odesa Agriculture Institute, from which he graduated in 1988.

From 1986–1998, Tsushko was the head of two collective farms. From 1994–2002, Vasyl Tsushko served as a national deputy of the second, third, and fourth convocations of the Verkhovna Rada (Ukrainian parliament). In 2005, he graduated from the National University of the Ministry of Internal Affairs, with the qualification of a lawyer. From May 1997, he was a member of the Socialist Party of Ukraine and the first Vice-president of the Committee of Bank and Financing of Ukraine. He was chosen as the head of the Odesa Oblast Government Administration on February 3, 2005.

Tsushko was chosen as the Minister of Internal Affairs on December 1, 2006, after his predecessor Yuriy Lutsenko was dismissed by the parliament. On May 26, 2007, Tsushko suffered from a heart attack and was later hospitalized under critical condition. According to medical results, he suffered from an overdose of methylxanthine. After worsening health, he was later flown to a hospital in Germany. A ukrainian advocate Tetyana Montyan, stated that his heart attack was a result of poisoning. The Interfax news agency reports that Vasyl Tsushko's condition deteriorated while in the medical clinic in Germany. On September 30, 2007, Tsushko announced that he would resign as Minister of Internal Affairs of Ukraine, due to the need of his health rehabilitation.

On July 24, 2010, Tsushko took over Socialist party leadership from Oleksandr Moroz 

Tsushko headed the Ukrainian Economy Ministry from March till December 2010 and was appointed as head of the Antimonopoly Committee of Ukraine on December 14, 2010. Worked as a Head of the Antimonopoly Committee till 26 March 2014.

Tsushko ran as a presidential candidate in 2014 Ukrainian presidential election. In the election he got 10 434 votes (0.06% of the total vote); making him the second to last most unsuccessful candidate of the election.

Tsushko is married and has a son and daughter. He is interested in historical literature.

References and footnotes

Footnotes

References

External links

1963 births
Living people
Second convocation members of the Verkhovna Rada
Third convocation members of the Verkhovna Rada
Fourth convocation members of the Verkhovna Rada
Fifth convocation members of the Verkhovna Rada
Interior ministers of Ukraine
Socialist Party of Ukraine politicians
Ukrainian people of Moldovan descent
People from Odesa Oblast
Recipients of the Order of Merit (Ukraine), 3rd class
Recipients of the Order of Merit (Ukraine), 2nd class
Candidates in the 2014 Ukrainian presidential election
Economy ministers of Ukraine
Governors of Odesa Oblast